Highway 35 is a paved undivided provincial highway in the Canadian province of Saskatchewan. It runs from the US Border near Port of Oungre (where it meets United States Route 85) to a dead end near the north shore of Tobin Lake. The CanAm Highway comprises  Saskatchewan Highways 35, SK Hwy 39, SK Hwy 6, SK Hwy 3, SK Hwy 2 and U.S. Route 85.   of SK Hwy 35 contribute to the CanAm Highway between Port of Oungre on the Canada – United States border and Weyburn. Mudslides, and spring flooding were huge road building and maintenance problems around Nipawin as well as along the southern portion of the route named the Greater Yellow Grass Marsh. Over 20 early dams were built until the problem was addressed with the Rafferty-Alameda Project on the Souris River and the construction of the Qu'Appelle River Dam which have helped to eliminate washed out roads and flooded communities. The highway through the homesteading community followed the Dominion Land Survey on the square until reaching the Saskatchewan River at Nipawin. The completion of the combined railway and traffic bridge over the Saskatchewan River at Nipawin in the late 1920s retired the ferry and basket crossing for traffic north of Nipawin. The E.B. Campbell Dam built in 1963 northeast of Nipawin created Tobin Lake, and Codette Lake was formed with the construction of the Francois-Finlay Hydroelectric dam at Nipawin. The railway/traffic bridge that formed part of Highway 35 was the only crossing utilized at Nipawin until a new traffic bridge was constructed in 1974. The new bridge then became part of the combined Highway 35 and 55 until the highway parts just east of White Fox. Highway 35 then continued north along the west side of Tobin Lake. The railway/traffic bridge continues to be utilized for one lane vehicle traffic controlled by traffic lights, and continues as the "old highway 35" on the west side of the river until it joins with the current Highway 35/55.

Route description

Highway 35 connects with the major Saskatchewan Highways SK Hwy 18, SK Hwy 39, SK Hwy 33, SK Hwy 48, SK Hwy 1, SK Hwy 22, SK Hwy 15, SK Hwy 16, SK Hwy 5, 3, and SK Hwy 55. The major communities of Weyburn, Fort Qu'Appelle, Wadena, Tisdale, and Nipawin are en route.  SK Hwy 35 has three distinct topographical areas when driving through Saskatchewan.  The rolling moraines and valleys of the mixed grassland give way to aspen parkland.  The aspen parkland encompasses both the Qu'Appelle River and the Quill Lakes saline water basin areas.  The northern portion of the route is southern boreal forest which still features agricultural land with more heavily forested areas.

CanAm highway

The southern portion of SK Hwy 35 from the Canada–United States border to Weyburn forms the initial segment of the CanAm Highway.  The terrain is mixed prairie featuring rolling moraines and valleys.   North American Free Trade Agreement NAFTA super corridors are a concept of huge transportation corridors connecting Mexico, United States, and Canada.  The CanAm highway was a concept begun in the 1920s. This area has been subject to criticism as the entry way to Canada of this route.  "The CanAm matters so little to Saskatchewan highway planners that they've turned the most southern part of it within the province -- the Highway 35 link from Weyburn to the little U.S. border crossing at Oungre -- to gravel. SK Hwy 35 achieved a dishonourable mention in the Canadian contest entitled 'Highways from Hell'.  "Brenda Bakken Lackey called Highway 35 an “embarrassment’’ and a hazard for truckers’ business since it was turned into a gravel roadway last year[2004].  'When it rains, there is mud and when it is dry, there is flying dust and gravel,' she said. 'Truckers from my constituency tell me that the U.S. Customs officials say they are not going to put up with the mud that is coming across on the trucks. There is also concerns about grain seeds and weeds coming across in the mud on truck tires.'...Highway Minister Maynard Sonntag said. 'Highway No. 6 has a much higher traffic count, many more trucks in and out from the States than Highway No. 35 would have.’' " "The projects on Highways 39 and 6 will help to improve traffic flow through these Canada/U.S. ports. 'Highways 6 and 39 are very important to Saskatchewan – serving as tourism links and major north-south trade corridors to the U.S.,' Sonntag said.  "Highway 35 from Wadena South is always an adventure. I have found my driving skills have improved immensely especially when it comes to emergency braking and swerving to avoid the many areas of broken pavement. This past spring the Dept. of Highways could have saved thousands in signage costs if they only had put up warning signs where the road was smooth and unbroken." The regional parks in this area are Nickle Lake, Mainprize, and Oungre Memorial as well as the Rafferty Reservoir.

Weyburn is the only city on SK Hwy 35 and has been dubbed the Soo Line City due its connection with Chicago on the Soo Line of the Canadian Pacific Railway CPR.  The city of  9,433  people is situated on SK Hwy 35, SK Hwy 39, and SK Hwy 13.  The small towns of Exon and Converge have been absorbed into the city of Weyburn today.   Weyburn is located astride the Williston geological Basin which contains oil deposits, and several wells operate in the vicinity.  Weyburn features roadside attractions of a large lighthouse water tower, wheat sheaves and prairie lily.

Aspen parkland

The Squirrel Hills are a topographical feature south of the Qu'Appelle River.   The town of Qu'Appelle with a population over 600, had historic beginnings with fur trading posts in this area, and is located within the South Qu'appelle No. 157 rural municipality RM at the intersection of SK Hwy 35 with SK Hwy 1, the TransCanada.  Qu'Appelle was first named Troy, and was an administrative centre of the North West Territories before Saskatchewan was incorporated as a province.  The terrain changes from mixed prairie to aspen parkland and the frequency of trembling aspen (Populus tremuloides) bluffs increase. Fort Qu'Appelle, with a population near 2,000, has a vibrant history being an early fur trading post south of Pasqua Lake and north of Fishing Lake, two of the Calling Lakes.  Fort Qu'Appelle is located at the junction of SK Hwy 35, SK Hwy 10, SK Hwy 22, SK Hwy 727, SK Hwy 56, and  SK Hwy 215.  The 1897 Hudson’s Bay Company store, 1911 Grand Trunk Pacific Railway station, Fort Qu’Appelle Sanatorium (Fort San), and the Treaty 4 Governance Centre are all landmarks of this community. A billboard and reconstructed Fort Qu'Appelle commemorate the history of the area where Treaty 4 was signed.  The population of Elfros has dropped from about 300 residents in 1955 to 110 in 2006.  It is located at the intersection of Hwy 16, the Yellowhead TransCanada. SK Hwy 35 traverses between the Little Touchwood Hills and Touchwood Hills area to the west and the Beaver Hills area on the east. Wadena at the SK Hwy 5 intersection hosts the Wadena & District Museum as well as the Jesmer & Milligan Marsh Projects Interpretative Center with information regarding the Quill Lakes International Shorebird Reserve.  Ponass Lake, Barrier Lake, Marean Lake, and Tobin Lake all feature resort areas, with the largest attraction in this area being the Greenwater Lake Provincial Park.

Southern boreal forest

The terrain which SK Hwy 35 travels through north of the Saskatchewan tree line is southern boreal forest marked by aspen combined with jackpine, tamarack and white spruce forested areas. The traffic count at the intersection of Hwy 35 and Hwy 3 at Tisdale is 11,200 vehicles per day. Tisdale is located in the heart of an agricultural community and honours the farming community with a big roadside statue of a honey bee. Nipawin is nestled between two created lakes, Tobin Lake and Codette Lake, hence its nickname "The Town on Two Lakes". The François-Finlay Hydro Station created Codette Lake in 1986. White Fox has honoured its namesake with a large white fox by the side of the road. The statue was built in 1995 as a "Welcome to the Village of White Fox, built by Families for Families, population 465". North of White Fox is "Tobin Lake, located 275 kilometres north-east of Saskatoon. The E.B. Campbell Dam can be accessed from the south-east shore of Tobin Lake. SK Hwy 35 skirts along the north-west shore of Tobin Lake, giving access to fishing locales from the highway access, such as Carroll's Cove Campground and Pruden's Point Resort.

History

The valleys of southern Saskatchewan have been subject to landslides.  Most landslides occur in the Cretaceous shale formations many years ago following the receding of the continental ice sheet.  In 1953, a rapid flow landslide destroyed a portion of SK Hwy 35 near Fort Qu'Appelle in the Echo Creek Valley.
The Souris River continues southeast through North Dakota eventually meeting the Assiniboine River in Manitoba. In the 19th century this area was known as an extension of the Greater Yellow Grass Marsh. "Extensive flood control programs have created reservoirs, parks and waterfowl centres along the Souris River." Between 1988 and 1995, the Rafferty-Alameda Project was constructed to alleviate spring flooding problems created by the Souris River.

The rural municipality of Indian Head No. 156 contained amongst its communities Fort Qu'Appelle and South Qu'Appelle in the late 19th century and early 20th century.  One of the early problems was spring flooding from the neighboring Qu'Appelle river when it overflowed its banks washing out bridges.  21 dams were built in the pioneering days to help with the yearly flooding.  The steel bridge built over the Qu'Appelle river at Blackwood Crossing eased problems of communication and commerce immensely. The Qu'Appelle River Dam and the Gardiner Dam formed Lake Diefenbaker.  The Qu'Appele River Dam is the origin of the Qu'Appelle River from whence it flows east to the confluence with the Assiniboine River in the province of Manitoba.
The Doghide / Leather River, and the Leather/Carrot River fork between Nipawin and Tisdale.  These rivers have also contributed to spring flooding in the region.  The historic Leather River Bridge is no longer being used but is an example of a steel truss bridge.

The ferry was the first method of transport across the Saskatchewan River at Nipawin.  A basket which was propelled above the river on wire could safely transport persons and mail across the river when travel was unsafe because of the ice break up.  The CPR bridge opened to traffic in 1932, to be replaced by a steel bridge with concrete piers which was opened by the Saskatchewan Department of Highways in 1974.

The highway runs south to north, and historically did not run on the square following both range and township surveyed road allowances, but rather was allowed to run straight and true along township roads for the most part.  The road traveled parallel to the rail between Wadena and Nipawin.

The Humboldt Broncos bus crash occurred on this highway at the intersection with Saskatchewan Highway 335 on April 6, 2018.

Major intersections
From south to north:

References

External links
End of U.S. Highway 85
Hillcrest Cemetery Weyburn, Saskatchewan
Junction of Highway #35 24 km North to Quill Lakes Bird Area
In God We Trust Elevator (near Nipawin) The Changing Face of the Saskatchewan Prairie Image Gallery: Private Elevators 
Postcard Views of Southeast Saskatchewan
Saskatchewan Highway 35 pictures
Northeast Saskatchewan is a distinct trading area that includes the communities of Tisdale, Nipawin, Melfort, Hudson Bay, and Wadena
The town of Qu'Appelle - photos of sightseeing in Saskatchewan on ..

Extra reading
Title: Homestead to Heritage, Author Armley History Book Committee, Publisher Friesen Printers, 1987

035
Weyburn